Cayurruca is a hamlet located in the commune of Río Bueno in Los Ríos Region, southern Chile.

References

Geography of Los Ríos Region
Populated places in Ranco Province